Casmena murrayi is a species of leaf beetle of West Africa and the Democratic Republic of the Congo. It was first described from Old Calabar, now in Nigeria, by Félicien Chapuis in 1874.

References

Eumolpinae
Beetles of the Democratic Republic of the Congo
Taxa named by Félicien Chapuis
Beetles described in 1874
Insects of West Africa